Gresini Racing is a motorcycle racing team competing in the MotoGP World Championship under the name Gresini Racing MotoGP as a Ducati satellite team, in the Moto2 World Championship as QJmotor Gresini Moto2, and the MotoE World Cup as Felo Gresini MotoE. The team also competes in CIV Moto3.

He died in 2021 due to COVID-19, with the team continuing under his widow Nadia Padovani. 

In , Gresini's rider Daijiro Kato won the 250cc title. The following season, the team stepped up to the MotoGP class, where they have been competing since. The team also competes in the Moto2 class since . That season, Gresini's rider Toni Elías won the inaugural Moto2 title.

History
The team competed in the 500 cc class with Brazilian rider Alex Barros and a Honda NSR500V two-cylinder bike. Barros ranked ninth in the final championship standings, and managed to record the team's first podium finish at Donington Park. The following year, Honda decided to supply Barros and the team with a Honda NSR500 four-cylinder bike, the same bike that was used by the factory team. Barros recorded two podium finishes and a series of top-five finishes to collect 138 points and fifth place in the final standings.

In , the team dropped down to the 250 cc class with a factory-supported Honda NSR250 and with reigning 250cc world champion Loris Capirossi as the rider. In the first race of the season at Sepang, Malaysia, Capirossi took the first ever win for the Gresini team. During the season, he earned two more wins and six other podium finishes, and finished the season third in the final standings with 209 points.

After Capirossi stepped up to the 500 cc for the 2000 season, the team signed young Japanese rider Daijiro Kato and French rider Vincent Philippe. Kato, who had already won two races as a wild-card racer in 1997 and 1998, made an instant impact with four consecutive podium finishes at the start of the season. He became a title contender for the 250 cc title along with Yamaha riders Shinya Nakano and Olivier Jacque until the last race of the season at Phillip Island, Australia. However, Kato finished third in the race and lost the title and the runner-up position to Jacque and Nakano respectively. Kato's 259 points and third place in the championship handed him the Rookie of the Year award in the 250cc class.

In , the team was renamed Telefónica Movistar Honda and former 125 cc world champion Emilio Alzamora was signed to replace Philippe. With both Nakano and Jacque moving to the 500cc class, Kato became the main contender for the 250 cc title. Kato dominated the season by winning 11 races during the season, handing the Gresini team their first world title. Alzamora added two podium finishes for the team as he went on to finish seventh in the final standings.

Due to the rule changes, the 500 cc class was renamed MotoGP and the new 990 cc four-stroke bikes were introduced by the factory teams. Kato rode the older Honda NSR500 two-stroke bike for the first nine races of the season before he received the new Honda RC211V prior to the Czech Republic Grand Prix at Brno. At the Spanish Grand Prix, Kato finished in second place for his first podium finish in the MotoGP class. He matched his best finish with another second place at Brno, in his first race with the new four-stroke bike. He also recorded the team's first ever pole position in the MotoGP class in the Pacific Grand Prix at Motegi, Japan. Kato ranked seventh in the final standings with 117 points and won the Rookie of the Year award, while the team ranked eighth in the MotoGP team standings. The team also competed in the 250cc class with Alzamora and Italian rider Roberto Rolfo. Rolfo was ranked third in the final standings with seven podium finishes while Alzamora was seventh with two podiums.

In , the team expanded their MotoGP class effort to two riders and was renamed Telefónica Movistar Honda as title sponsor Telefónica joined from Suzuki. Former Suzuki rider Sete Gibernau also joined the team as their second rider. Kato remained with the team and became one of four Honda official riders, riding the latest 2003-spec RC211V, while Gibernau was given the modified 2002 bike. In the opening race at Suzuka, Japan, Kato crashed into the tyre barrier. He suffered serious injuries and went into a coma for two weeks before he died in hospital. A week after Kato's death, Gibernau started from pole position and won the South African Grand Prix at Welkom, which marked the first race win for the Gresini team in the MotoGP class. During the post-race interview, Gibernau dedicated the win for his late teammate. He remained as the team's sole rider until reigning Japanese Supersport champion Ryuichi Kiyonari joined the team from the fourth race onwards. The team also promoted Gibernau to the 2003-spec bike left by Kato, while Kiyonari received the modified 2002 bike. Gibernau won three more races and recorded a total of ten podium finishes as he took the second place in the championship with 277 points. The team was ranked fourth in the teams standings as Gibernau and Kiyonari scored a combined 299 points.

In , Gibernau fought for the championship and finished runner up. His teammate, Colin Edwards, finished fifth. Melandri won two races. In  the team lined up Melandri and Toni Elías with Elías bringing Fortuna sponsorship back to the team, and the team achieved four victories, three for Melandri and one for Elías. The team also changed their tyre supplier to Bridgestone. The new 800 cc Honda RC212V did not deliver the results expected and the team finished the season with 2 podiums. For , Alex de Angelis and Shinya Nakano joined the team, with a new sponsor – San Carlo. For , Elías re-joined the team, replacing Nakano who deferred to World Superbikes.

In , Marco Melandri re-joined the team after a turbulent period riding for Ducati and Kawasaki, with 2008 250cc champion Marco Simoncelli announced as his new teammate. The Gresini team won the inaugural Moto2 division with rider Toni Elías aboard a Honda powered Moriwaki chassis. In the MotoGP division, Simoncelli finished eighth overall while Melandri ended the season in tenth place.

For 2011, Simoncelli was promoted to ride a factory Honda as part of the Gresini team, whilst Hiroshi Aoyama rode a satellite Honda for the team. Simoncelli was competitive at the top end of the field but a number of crashes kept his points score low. In October 2011, it was announced that Simoncelli would remain with the team for the 2012 season, however, Aoyama announced a move to Castrol Honda in the Superbike World Championship. On 23 October 2011, Simoncelli died after a racing accident at the Malaysian Grand Prix.

In 2015, Gresini ended their long-standing partnership with Honda in the premier class. Aprilia returned to the MotoGP paddock with a factory effort with track-side operations to be managed by Gresini. However, the same year Gresini began using Honda machinery in their Moto3 programme, replacing KTM.

In 2018, Gresini achieved a 1-2 championship finish in the Moto3 class with riders Jorge Martín and Fabio Di Giannantonio.

In 2019, Gresini was granted two slots in the newly created MotoE class, as all other satellite teams in the MotoGP class (despite being the sole Aprilia entry, Gresini was not an official team). With two wins and only finishes within the top-5 on the season, rider Matteo Ferrari clinched the inaugural MotoE Cup.

On 23 February 2021, Fausto Gresini died after a two-month battle with COVID-19. The team continued with Gresini's wife Nadia Padovani taking over as team owner and principal. Aleix Espargaró scored his first podium in MotoGP during the 2021 British Grand Prix, marking the first MotoGP-era podium for Aprilia and Gresini Racing's first podium since the 2014 French Grand Prix with Álvaro Bautista.

For 2022, Aprilia re-entered the sport with their own factory team, taking incumbent riders Maverick Viñales and Espargaró. Gresini Racing elected to return to fully independent team status with Ducati machinery, fielding Italian riders and former Gresini Moto3 teammates Enea Bastianini and Di Giannantonio. Gresini additionally left the Moto3 class in order to focus on their MotoGP and Moto2 efforts, after a decade in the class.

From 2023, Chinese motorcycle manufacturer QJmotor is the main sponsor of Gresini Racing Moto2. QJ Motor's involvement in motorcycle racing is not just this time. In 2022, QJ Motor, has debuted by supporting the Avintia racing team in the Moto3 class. After officially becoming the main sponsor, the name of the racing team it now carries changed to QJmotor Gresini Racing.

Results

By rider

By year

Notes
* Season still in progress.

MotoGP results
(key) (Races in bold indicate pole position; races in italics indicate fastest lap)

Notes

References

External links 
 gresiniracing.com Official Website
 gresiniracingmoto2.com Official Website
 San Carlo Honda Gresini at MotoGP.com
 Gresini Racing Moto2 at MotoGP.com
 Gresini Honda at autoevolution.com

Motorcycle racing teams
Motorcycle racing teams established in 1997
1997 establishments in Italy